VMN may refer to:

 Virtual manufacturing network
 Visicom Media Network
 Vysshaya Mera Nakazaniya, a legal term for "the supreme measure of punishment", a euphemism for capital punishment
 Ventromedial nucleus of the hypothalamus
 A fictional brain area in Philip Kerr's novel A Philosophical Investigation